Michelle Meunier (born 24 January 1956) is a French politician who has sat in the French Senate since 2011.

See also 

 List of senators of Loire-Atlantique
 Women in the French Senate

References 

1956 births
Living people
Politicians from Nantes
Socialist Party (France) politicians
Senators of Loire-Atlantique
French Senators of the Fifth Republic
21st-century French politicians
21st-century French women politicians
Women mayors of places in France
Women members of the Senate (France)